This is a list of municipalities in Tunisia which have standing links to local communities in other countries known as "town twinning" (usually in Europe) or "sister cities" (usually in the rest of the world).

A
Aryanah

 Gaziantep, Turkey
 Salé, Morocco

B
Le Bardo
 Rueil-Malmaison, France

Béja
 Beja, Portugal

Ben Arous

 Aprilia, Italy
 Saint-Étienne, France

Beni Hassen
 Schöningen, Germany

Bizerte

 Annaba, Algeria
 Kalamata, Greece
 Palermo, Italy
 Port Said, Egypt
 Tangier, Morocco

C
Carthage

 Aix-en-Provence, France
 Tyre, Lebanon
 Versailles, France

G
Gabès
 Trabzon, Turkey

Gafsa

 Naples, Italy
 Selçuklu, Turkey

Gremda
 Villefontaine, France

H
Hammam Sousse

 Boussu, Belgium
 Cheyenne, United States

Hammamet

 Aqaba, Jordan
 Nevers, France

Hammam-Lif

 Antony, France
 Granby, Canada
 Kenitra, Morocco
 Luxeuil-les-Bains, France
 Salsomaggiore Terme, Italy
 Zawiya, Libya

J
Jendouba

 Keçiören, Turkey
 Wolfsburg, Germany

K
Kairouan

 Bursa, Turkey
 Cairo, Egypt
 Córdoba, Spain
 Fez, Morocco
 Nishapur, Iran
 Samarkand, Uzbekistan
 Timbuktu, Mali

El Kef

 Bourg-en-Bresse, France
 Malatya, Turkey

Kelibia

 Almuñécar, Spain
 Marsala, Italy
 Pantelleria, Italy

Ksour Essef
 Plön, Germany

M
Mahdia

 Alanya, Turkey
 Aveiro, Portugal
 Mazara del Vallo, Italy

Majaz al Bab
 Mora, Portugal

Manouba
 Meram, Turkey

Medenine
 Bédarieux, France

Menzel Bourguiba

 La Seyne-sur-Mer, France
 Stuttgart, Germany

Midoun
 Mauguio, France

Monastir

 Dushanbe, Tajikistan
 Manisa, Turkey
 Münster, Germany
 Saint-Étienne, France
 Tétouan, Morocco
 Tizi Ouzou, Algeria

M'saken
 Ronse, Belgium

N
Nabeul

 El Jadida, Morocco
 Marbella, Spain
 Montélimar, France
 Seto, Japan

Nefta
 Creil, France

O
Oueslatia
 Collegno, Italy

S
Sfax

 Dakar, Senegal
 Grenoble, France
 Makhachkala, Russia
 Marburg, Germany
 Oran, Algeria
 Safi, Morocco

Siliana
 Kahramanmaraş, Turkey

Sousse

 Boulogne-Billancourt, France
 Braunschweig, Germany
 Constantine, Algeria
 İzmir, Turkey
 Ljubljana, Slovenia
 Marrakesh, Morocco
 Nice, France
 Thiès, Senegal
 Weihai, China

T
Tabarka
 Fréjus, France

Tataouine
 Sakarya, Turkey

Tazerka
 Frameries, Belgium

Testour
 Mora, Portugal

Tozeur

 Beyoğlu, Turkey
 Geestland, Germany

Tunis

 Amman, Jordan
 Ankara, Turkey
 Barcelona, Spain
 Cologne, Germany
 Doha, Qatar
 Istanbul, Turkey
 Kuwait City, Kuwait
 Marseille, France
 Montreal, Canada
 Muscat, Oman
 Rabat, Morocco
 Rio de Janeiro, Brazil

References

Tunisia
Foreign relations of Tunisia
Tunisia geography-related lists
Cities in Tunisia
Populated places in Tunisia